Neoregelia compacta is a species of flowering plant in the genus Neoregelia. This species is endemic to Brazil.

Cultivars
 Neoregelia 'Alpha'
 Neoregelia 'Black Heart'
 Neoregelia 'Bossa Nova'
 Neoregelia 'Candelabra'
 Neoregelia 'Clotho'
 Neoregelia 'Crown Prince'
 Neoregelia 'Eleanor'
 Neoregelia 'Fire Nymph'
 Neoregelia 'Fire Pixie'
 Neoregelia 'Fire Sprite'
 Neoregelia 'Geisha Girl'
 Neoregelia 'Huckelberry Finn'
 Neoregelia 'Jazz'
 Neoregelia 'Milky Way'
 Neoregelia 'Pacquito'
 Neoregelia 'Red Rover'
 Neoregelia 'Royal Robe'
 Neoregelia 'Summer Of '42'
 Neoregelia 'Super Fireball'
 Neoregelia 'Warren Loose'
 Neoregelia 'Windflower'

References

BSI Cultivar Registry Retrieved 11 October 2009

compacta
Flora of Brazil